Giolla na Naomh Ó Cianain (died 14 August 1348) was an Abbot of Lisgoole, Ireland. He was the earliest recorded member of the Ó Cianain family of historians.

Sources

 The Learned Family of Ó Cianain/Keenan, by Nollaig Ó Muraíle,  in Clougher Record, pp. 387–436, 2005.

Augustinian Order
People from County Fermanagh
14th-century deaths
Year of birth missing
14th-century Irish historians
14th-century Irish abbots
1348 deaths